Alex Clubb (born October 23, 1991) is an American professional stock car racing driver who is currently scheduled to compete full-time in the ARCA Menards Series, driving the No. 03 for his family-owned team, Clubb Racing Inc.

Racing career

ARCA Menards Series 
Clubb would get his start with Carter 2 Motorsports in 2015, retiring and finishing 26th due to valve issues. He would run two more races that year, finishing a best of 17th at the Illinois State Fairgrounds Racetrack.

In 2017, he would make his return, this time driving with his team, Clubb Racing. He would make select starts for the next three seasons, finishing a best of 12th at Toledo.

In 2019, he would make a one-off start with Wayne Peterson Racing, finishing last due to brake problems.

In 2020, he would sign with Fast Track Racing after missing most of the season due to the birth of his newly born son. He would retire, finishing last due to vibrations.

In 2021, he would form a new team with fellow driver Tim Richmond, combining their assets to form Richmond Clubb Motorsports. Clubb would race seven races of the year, with Richmond running 9. He would manage to achieve his first top 10 at the 2021 Dutch Boy 150 and would get another at the next race. The season would see him with his best season yet, finishing 21st in the standings. After Richmond got injured at the 2021 Henry Ford Health System 200, Clubb was expecting to replace him- but, instead, he was replaced by Zachary Tinkle. The two split ways afterward.

In 2022, he would announce that he would go back to running his team, hoping to run full-time.

Personal life 
Clubb is currently married, and has one son, born in 2020.

Clubb is the owner of a lawn care company in his hometown, called A. Clubb Lawn Care, and works as a bouncer on weekends he isn't racing. Clubb is also a member of the Morris City Council, and is a Republican.

Motorsports career results

ARCA Menards Series 
(key) (Bold – Pole position awarded by qualifying time. Italics – Pole position earned by points standings or practice time. * – Most laps led.)

ARCA Menards Series East

ARCA Menards Series West 
(key) (Bold – Pole position awarded by qualifying time. Italics – Pole position earned by points standings or practice time. * – Most laps led.)

References 
https://www.speedwaydigest.com/index.php/news/racing-news/74491-blue-collar-clubb-alex-clubb-turns-dream-into-reality

External links 

 Alex Clubb driver statistics at Racing-Reference

1991 births
Living people
ARCA Menards Series drivers
NASCAR drivers
Racing drivers from Illinois